Cedar is an unincorporated community in southeastern Mahaska County, Iowa, United States.  It lies along Iowa Highway 23 southeast of the city of Oskaloosa, the county seat of Mahaska County.

Cedar has a Methodist church, Christian Reformed church, and a grain elevator.

History
A post office opened in 1874.

The Burlington and Western Railway arrived in Cedar in late 1882.  This was a narrow gauge line, widened to standard gauge in 1902 and taken over by the Chicago, Burlington and Quincy.  the Burlington line was abandoned in 1934.

Cedar's population was 53 in 1925.

References

Unincorporated communities in Mahaska County, Iowa
Unincorporated communities in Iowa
1874 establishments in Iowa
Populated places established in 1874